Fabio Van den Bossche (born 21 September 2000) is a Belgian road and track cyclist, who currently rides for UCI ProTeam .

Major results

2014
 1st  Madison, National Novice Track Championships (with Nicolas Wernimont)
2017
 UEC European Junior Track Championships
1st  Madison (with Nicolas Wernimont)
2nd Points race
 National Junior Track Championships
1st  Madison (with Nicolas Wernimont)
1st  Points race
 1st  Overall Keizer der Juniores
 1st Vlaams-Brabant Classic
2018
 UEC European Junior Track Championships
1st  Madison (with Nicolas Wernimont)
1st  Omnium
 National Track Championships
1st  Derny
1st  Points race
2nd Madison
2nd Scratch
2nd Omnium
 1st  Overall Sint-Martinusprijs Kontich
2019
 2nd Team pursuit, UEC European Under-23 Track Championships
2021
 2nd  Omnium, UEC European Track Championships
2022
 UCI World Championships
 3rd  Madison (with Lindsay De Vylder)
 3rd  Points race
 3rd  Madison, UEC European Track Championships (with Robbe Ghys)

References

External links

2000 births
Living people
Belgian male cyclists
Belgian track cyclists
Sportspeople from Ghent
Cyclists from East Flanders
Cyclists at the 2019 European Games
European Games competitors for Belgium
21st-century Belgian people